Restaurant Row may refer to a street or region known for having multiple restaurants.

Specific Restaurant Rows include:

 Restaurant Row (Beverly Hills)
 Restaurant Row (New York City)
 Restaurant Row (Orlando)

See also

 List of restaurant districts and streets
"Restaurant Row", an episode of the sitcom The King of Queens